Alejandro Felipe Paula also known as Jandi Paula (2 May 1937 – 13 August 2018) was a Curaçaoan academic, historian and politician. He served as Prime Minister of the Netherlands Antilles from 28 December 1993 to 31 March 1994. Paula was director of the National Archive of the Netherlands Antilles between 1969 and 1989. He also was a professor and rector at the University of the Netherlands Antilles in the 1990s.

Career
Paula was born on Curaçao on 2 May 1937. He was partially schooled in Trinidad and Tobago. Paula later studied in the Netherlands, the Dominican Republic and Italy. After the 1969 Curaçao uprising Paula served on the Rebuilding commission and the investigationary commission. He served as chair of the latter commission but resigned after being threatened.

Paula served as director of the National Archive of the Netherlands Antilles between 1969 and 1989. Paula was a lecturer, and later professor, of sociology, philosophy and human rights at the University of the Netherlands Antilles from 1990 to 2000. In his last three years he served as rector magnificus.

On 19 November 1993 a Curaçao status referendum was held. With the outcome in opposition to what she had campaigned for, Prime Minister Maria Liberia Peters resigned. She was succeeded by Suzanne Camelia-Römer. Paula was appointed as formateur by Governor of the Netherlands Antilles, Jaime Saleh. He managed to form a coalition government which would rule until a government would be formed after the February 1994 general election. Paula himself served as Prime Minister of the Netherlands Antilles. His government was sworn in on 28 December 1993. He was succeeded when the government of Miguel Pourier was installed on 31 March 1994.

Personal life
Paula married a woman from Trinidad in 1966. The couple has two children. In 2011 the Peter Stuyvesant College was renamed in Paula's honour. Paula died on August 13, 2018 due to health complications.

Works
 Slavery in a Nutshell (1987)
 Hoofdmomenten uit de staatkundige ontwikkeling van de Nederlandse Antillen (1989)
 1795: De slavenopstand op Curaçao (1994)
 The Cry of My Life (2005)

References

1937 births
2018 deaths
Curaçao historians
Prime Ministers of the Netherlands Antilles
Academic staff of the University of Curaçao